Law enforcement in Tajikistan is primarily the responsibility of the Ministry of Internal Affairs, which controls the police force, which is referred to as the militia occasionally. It is divided into multiple departments, each led by an officer, including the Tajik Internal Troops, as well as the National Guard, which takes orders directly from the President of Tajikistan. The Minister of Internal Affairs oversees it all. The Drug Control Agency is responsible for combating drug trafficking, which has been a major problem due to high heroin production in Afghanistan, to the south.

Police

The Police of Tajikistan are the national police forces of Tajikistan. Founded in November 1992, the police consists of various operational divisions and departments. Every year on 10 November, Tajikistan celebrates Police Day. As of January 2018, Tajikistan is one of four countries (along with Belarus, Uzbekistan and Kyrgyzstan) where the term Militsiya is still formally retained as the service's official name. The term is sometimes still translated as "police". The service uniform and equipment of police officers in Tajikistan are similar to the service uniform and equipment of the Soviet police. In the summer of 2021, an Iranian police office was opened in Tajikistan.

Drug Control Agency

References

 
Government of Tajikistan